Jalouse was an 18-gun Belliqueuse-class brig-corvette of the French Navy, built to a design by Pierre-Alexandre-Laurent Forfait, and launched in 1794 at Honfleur. The Royal Navy captured her in May 1797 and took her into service under her existing name. In British service she served primarily on the North Sea station where she captured three small French privateers, and many Dutch merchant vessels. She also participated with other British warships in two or three major cutting-out expeditions. She was broken up in 1807.

French service
Between 24 March 1794 and 25 August, Jalouse was at Le Havre and Ostend, and under the command of lieutenant de vaisseau Astague.

On 5 October 1795 lieutenant de vaiseau Pierre-Édouard Plucket took command of Jalouse. At the time she was apparently armed with 12 guns, and had a crew of 150 men.

Under his command, Jalouse in a 15-day cruise in 1795 captured seven prizes and 52 men.

From 7 March 1797 until her capture, French official records confirm that Jalouse was under Plucket's command, and based at Flessingue. From there she cruised the North Sea, and arrived at Bergen. Sailing from Bergen, she captured three prizes, including a whaler of eight guns and 42 men. He also burnt three vessels under the guns of a fort at Berwick.

On 27 March, or 7 April (records differ),  Jalouse encountered the sloop  in the North Sea. An inconclusive 11-hour engagement ensued.

Afterwards Plucket reported that he had engaged a 38-gun frigate; according to a French account, Captain James Wallis of Tisiphone reported that he had engaged a 28-gun frigate. Supposedly, when Plucket's English prisoners from prizes returned to Britain and reported that Jalouse was a 12-gun brig, Wallis was court-martialed and reduced in rank. There seems to be only passing mention of the engagement in one English-language source that makes no mention of a court martial and that identifies Tisiphones opponent as the privateer Naïade.

After the engagement with Tisiphone, Jalouse returned to Bergen. There she replenished her store of munitions, recruited 20 Dutch sailors to rebuild his crew, and then set out for Flessingue. On the way she captured two more British vessels.

Capture
, under the command of Captain Charles White, captured Jalouse at about 5a.m. on 13 May 1797 near Elsinor after a chase of about nine hours and running about 84 hours. For an hour and a half during the chase Jalouse fired her stern chasers, two long 12-pounder guns. White was able to bring Vestal alongside Jalouse and fired three broadsides before she struck, having suffered great damage to her masts and rigging. At the time of capture, Jalouse had 16 guns, though she was pierced for 20, and had shifted some guns to the vacant ports. Her armament consisted of twelve "very long 12-pounders", and four 6-pounder guns. Her commander, "C. Plucket", had a crew of 153 men, two of whom were killed and five of whom were wounded. Vestal suffered no casualties. Vestal brought Jalouse into the Humber.

The British took their French prisoners back to England. Plucket managed to escape and return to France. The court martial for the loss of Jalouse then acquitted him.

British service
Jalouse underwent fitting out at Deptford between 24 July and 16 October 1797. Commander John Temple commissioned Jalouse in September 1797 for the North Sea.

Jalouses first documented capture was the merchant vessel Gerrit Hendrick Groote, which Jalouse captured on 7 May 1798. Later that month, on 25 May, Jalouse captured Mercurius, which was condemned as droit of Admiralty.

In June and July Jalouse captured Zeelust, Antonella, Anna, and Surprize.

On 22 February 1799 Jalouse captured Hermina. The next dayJalouse was off the Texel when she captured  the French privateer brig Jason. Jason, of Dunkirk, was armed with 14 guns and had a crew of 52 men.

Lieutenant Dawes, of the hired armed cutter Phoenix arrived at Yarmouth Roads on 9 March with intelligence from the Haak Sands at the mouth of the Texel. He reported that he had observed 20 enemy vessels moored as they had been all winter. He further reported that Jalouse was always on site, so that Temple would readily observe any enemy activity. Dawes also brought with him a letter from Temple stating that prisoners from Jason had reported that 15,000 troops in France were to march to Holland to be embarked on transports.

Jalouse was in company on 10 April with the hired armed cutters Nancy and Phoenix. They shared the proceeds of the capture of the brig Maria. Two days later Jalouse and Nancy captured Unvernkorff. Two days after that, Jalouse and Nancy recaptured Friendship.

Jalouse and  recaptured the cutter Rover on 10 May. On 4 June  and Jalouse recaptured the sloop Ceres. Jalouse recaptured both off the coast of Norway and sent them into Yarmouth. Rover had been sailing from Riga to Hull when captured, and Ceres, of Berwick, had been sailing from Leith to London.

When the British boats arrived, they found that their targets were pulled up on shore where the cutting out party could not reach them. The British instead took out 12 merchant vessels, six with cargoes and six in ballast, and retreated. There were no British casualties, even though Dutch shore batteries fired on the attackers. A later prize money notice identified some of the Dutch vessels as Twee Gebroders (Dirks, master), Twee Gebroders (Jansen, master), Jonge Evert, Vrow Regina, Anna Elizabeth, Vrow Trentje, and four fishing vessels.

Then on 10 July Jalouse was a part of a small squadron consisting also of Espiegle, Courier, Pylades, and the hired armed cutter Nancy, all under Winthrop's command  in Circe. The boats of the squadron rowed for 15 or 16 hours into the Watt at the back of Ameland. There they captured three merchant vessels carrying sugar, wine and brandy, and destroyed a galliot loaded with ordnance and stores.

On 24 November 1799 Admiral Lord Duncan sent Jalouse find a privateer that had been operating off the coast. Jalouse encountered the privateer on the 29th. and she struck after a chase of 5 hours. She was a brand new, copper-bottomed lugger called Fantasie, of 14 guns and 60 men. Temple was able to rescue the four masters and 35 seamen of four laden colliers that the privateer had taken the previous day close in to Flamborough Head. He then went off towards Ostend in pursuit of the prizes and on the 30th he retook Sally, of Lynn. She had been launched 17 June 1793 at Boulogne; Inabordable had been launched 12 August 1793 at Calais.}}

Lucius Curtis received promotion to commander on 16 November 1804, and assumed command of Jalouse, then in the Mediterranean Fleet, later that month.

A convoy from Smyrna arrived at Malta on 2 January 1805, and the convoy left for England on 4 January. Jalouse had escorted the convoy from Smyrna and she continued on as an escort as far as western Sicily. In June 1805 Curtis commissioned  at Portsmouth.

In an enclosure to a letter dated 7 October 1805, Admiral Lord Nelson wrote, "Jalouse, Childers, and Merlin being unfit for the service of this Country, are ordered home with the first Convoy to be repaired".

Fate
Merlin and Childers went on to serve for some more time. However, Jalouse was paid off in May 1806. She was then broken up at Woolwich in March 1807.

Notes, citations and references
Notes

Citations

References
 
Castlereagh, Viscount Robert Stewart, and Charles William Vane, Marquis of Londonderry (1848) Memoirs and correspondence of Viscount Castlereagh, second Marquess of Londonderry, Vol. 2. (H. Colburn).
 
 
  
 

 
 
  
 

1794 ships
Corvettes of the French Navy
Captured ships
Sloops of the Royal Navy